Washington Whispers Murder is a 1953 murder mystery by Leslie Ford. It was published in hardcover by Charles Scribner's Sons and later in paperback by Dell.

External links 
Washington Whispers Murder at Kirkus Reviews
Washington Whispers Murder at Fantastic Fiction
Washington Whispers Murder at Goodreads

1953 novels
American mystery novels
Novels set in Washington, D.C.
Charles Scribner's Sons books